A Christina piercing, also known as a Venus piercing, is a genital piercing. It is located where the outer labia meet, below the pubic mound. The Christina piercing is anatomy dependent; it has a high rejection rate, and is not possible for all women due to anatomical variation. The piercing does not facilitate sexual stimulation and can be found uncomfortable when pressure is applied. It is usually pierced with either a custom-made curved barbell or surface bar to reduce the risk of rejection.

See also
Nefertiti piercing

References

External links 
 Body Modification E-Zine Encyclopedia entry on Christina piercings

Female genital piercings

fr:Christina (piercing)